NWA Shockwave is a professional wrestling streaming television program produced by the National Wrestling Alliance (NWA). The show began airing on December 1, 2020 on NWA's YouTube channel. The series primarily featured matches taped during United Wrestling Network's weekly pay-per-view series, UWN Primetime Live.

List of episodes

References

External links
 
 Official NWA YouTube channel
 

2020 American television series debuts
2020s American television series
National Wrestling Alliance shows
American professional wrestling television series
American non-fiction web series
English-language television shows
YouTube original programming
United Wrestling Network